The 1995 NCAA Division I women's volleyball tournament began with 48 teams and ended on December 16, 1995, when Nebraska defeated Texas 3 games to 1 in the NCAA championship match.

Nebraska defeated Texas 11-15, 15-2, 15-7, 16-14. Nebraska was led by Katie Crnich and Billie Winsett who each had 25 kills. After losing its second match of the season to then-No. 1 Stanford, Nebraska reeled off 31 consecutive matches to claim the NCAA title and had the program's best season at 32-1 (.970%).

Play-in games

Records

Brackets

Pacific regional

East regional

Central regional

Mountain regional

Final Four - Mullins Center, Amherst, Massachusetts

See also
NCAA Women's Volleyball Championship

References

NCAA Women's Volleyball Championship
NCAA
Volleyball in Massachusetts
December 1995 sports events in the United States
Sports competitions in Massachusetts
Women's sports in Massachusetts